HHT may refer to:
 Human-to-human transmission of infectious disease
 Headquarters and Headquarters Troop, in the U.S. Army
 Heinrich Hertz Submillimeter Telescope
 Heinrich-Hertz-Turm, in Hamburg, Germany
 Hereditary hemorrhagic telangiectasia, or Rendu-Osler-Weber disease
 Hilbert–Huang transform
 Hiphop Tamizha, an Indian musical duo
 Historic House Trust of New York City
 Historic Houses Trust, New South Wales
 Omega-hydroxypalmitate O-feruloyl transferase, an enzyme
 Howard Thompson (film critic), who wrote under the pen name HHT